Gazzada Schianno is a comune (municipality) in the Province of Varese in the Italian region Lombardy, located about  northwest of Milan and about  south of Varese. It is served by Gazzada-Schianno-Morazzone railway station.

Gazzada Schianno borders the following municipalities: Brunello, Buguggiate, Lozza, Morazzone, Varese. It is formed by two main localities, Gazzada and Schianno.

Gazzada was the venue in 1967 for discussions between Anglicans and Catholics following the Second Vatican Council.

Twin towns
  Seckach, Germany

References

Cities and towns in Lombardy